Deh Now is a village in Kakhk Rural District, Kakhk District, Gonabad County, Razavi Khorasan Province, Iran. At the 2006 census, its population was 17, in 6 families.

References 

Populated places in Gonabad County